JFK: Reckless Youth is a 1993 TV drama miniseries portraying the early life of American president John F. Kennedy. It was adapted from the 1992 biography of the same name by Nigel Hamilton. The adaptation was directed by Harry Winer and written by Hamilton and William Broyles, Jr. Patrick Dempsey played the young future president, while Terry Kinney, Loren Dean, Diana Scarwid and Robin Tunney portray members of his family.

Plot 
The miniseries portrays the life of John F. Kennedy (Dempsey) from his school days to his 1946 victory in the election for Massachusetts's 11th congressional district. He attends the Protestant all-boys Dexter School in Boston and later the Choate School. 

At Harvard, John Kennedy joins the Spee Club. After traveling to England and Germany, he publishes Why England Slept. Upon returning to the United States, he is introduced to Inga Arvad by his sister "Kick."

At the age of 29, Kennedy's father tells him to take over the congressional seat of James Curley who becomes the mayor of Boston. With the help of his grandfather, Kennedy's campaign for the seat is successful.

Cast

Release and reception 
The miniseries premiered on November 21, 1993, and was released on DVD on June 27, 2006. Ken Tucker, writing for Entertainment Weekly in 1993, gave the miniseries a B− rating, lauding Dempsey's performance, but saying "Whether you think the TV version of Reckless Youth is worth the film it was recorded on probably depends on how you feel about the value of a few good acting performances."

See also
 Cultural depictions of John F. Kennedy

References

External links 
 
 
 JFK: Reckless Youth on the website of Hearst Entertainment

1990s American television miniseries
1993 American television series debuts
Television shows based on British novels
Works about John F. Kennedy
Films about John F. Kennedy
American Broadcasting Company original programming
Television series set in the 1930s
Television series set in the 1940s
1993 American television series endings